In Greek mythology, the name Coresus (Ancient Greek: Κόρησος) may refer to:

Coresus, an autochthon, who, together with Ephesus (son of Cayster), was believed to have founded the sanctuary of the Ephesian Artemis. The Amazons were so closely associated with this sanctuary that, according to Pausanias' remark, Pindar erroneously credited them, and not Coresus and Ephesus, with having founded it. Cayster, father of Ephesus, was thought to have been the son of the Amazon Penthesilea.

Coresus, a priest of Dionysus in Calydon, who was in love with Callirhoe. The girl would not answer her feelings, so Coresus, in despair, prayed to Dionysus that he may be avenged. The population of the city was then struck with a sort of madness that resembled the state of intoxication, which was lethal to many of them. They consulted the oracle at Dodona as to how to put an end to the calamity; the answer was that they had to propitiate the god by sacrificing either Callirhoe or someone who would consent to die in her stead. No one, and not even Callirhoe's foster parents, would do anything to save her life, so she was brought to the altar. Coresus was to perform the sacrificial rite, but, unable to kill his loved one, he slew himself instead. At the sight of him lying dead, Callirhoe was overcome with remorse and, soon after, cut her throat at a spring that later received her name.

Notes

References 

 Pausanias, Description of Greece with an English Translation by W.H.S. Jones, Litt.D., and H.A. Ormerod, M.A., in 4 Volumes. Cambridge, MA, Harvard University Press; London, William Heinemann Ltd. 1918. . Online version at the Perseus Digital Library
 Pausanias, Graeciae Descriptio. 3 vols. Leipzig, Teubner. 1903.  Greek text available at the Perseus Digital Library.

Autochthons of classical mythology
Characters in Greek mythology